Shalva Gadabadze (born May 30, 1984 in Tbilisi, Georgian SSR) is an amateur Azerbaijani Greco-Roman wrestler, who competes in the men's light heavyweight category. He won two bronze medals at the 2009 European Wrestling Championships in Vilnius, Lithuania, and at the 2011 European Wrestling Championships in Dortmund, Germany. He is a member of Atasport Wrestling Club in Baku, and is coached and trained by Eldshin Dshafarov.

Gadabadze represented his current nation, Azerbaijan, at the 2008 Summer Olympics in Beijing, where he competed in the men's 84 kg class. He first defeated Tunisia's Haykel Achouri in the preliminary round of sixteen, before losing the quarterfinal match to Hungary's Zoltán Fodor, with a technical score of 2–5. Because his opponent advanced further into the final, Gadabadze was offered another shot at the bronze medal by entering the repechage bouts. He was defeated by China's Ma Sanyi in the first repechage round, with a score of 5–6.

At the 2012 Summer Olympics in London, Gadabadze switched to a heavier class, competing in the men's 96 kg. He received a bye for the second preliminary round, before losing out to Russia's Rustam Totrov, who was able to score three points in two straight periods. Because Totrov advanced further into the final, Gadabadze qualified for the repechage bout, where he was defeated by Sweden's Jimmy Lidberg, with a technical score of 1–2.

References

External links
Profile – International Wrestling Database
NBC Olympics Profile

Azerbaijani male sport wrestlers
1984 births
Living people
Olympic wrestlers of Azerbaijan
Wrestlers at the 2008 Summer Olympics
Wrestlers at the 2012 Summer Olympics
Sportspeople from Tbilisi
World Wrestling Championships medalists
Universiade medalists in wrestling
Universiade medalists for Georgia (country)
Medalists at the 2005 Summer Universiade